Ptychadena christyi is a species of frog in the family Ptychadenidae.
It is found in Democratic Republic of the Congo and Uganda.
Its natural habitats are subtropical or tropical moist lowland forest and intermittent freshwater marshes.

References

Ptychadena
Taxonomy articles created by Polbot
Amphibians described in 1919